Dundun may refer to;
The Yoruba talking drum
Dunun, dundun or doundoun, a family of West African bass drums
Dunedin, the second-largest city in the South Island of New Zealand
Dundun, a snack in Yoruba Nigerian cuisine, made by roasting or deep-frying slices of yam
Dun Dun Noodles

See also
"Dunn Dunn", the second single from Shawty Lo's debut solo album, Units in the City